Dell'Impero delle Tenebre is the first studio album by the Italian band Il Teatro degli Orrori, released in 2007.

Quotes
 In the song "L'impero delle tenebre" the initial verse Abbiamo perso la memoria del ventesimo secolo ("We have lost the memory of the twentieth century") is a clear work cited by the song "Evaporazione" by Area where Demetrio Stratos sang Abbiamo perso la memoria del quindicesimo secolo ("We have lost the memory of the fifteenth century").
 The song "La canzone di Tom" is dedicated to Tom, a friend of Capovilla and Favero and manager of One Dimensional Man.

Videoclips
Were made video clips of the songs "Compagna Teresa" (directed by Mauro Lovisetto), "La canzone di Tom" (directed by Mauro Lovisetto) and "Carrarmatorock!" (directed by Angelo Camba).

Track list
"Vita mia" – 4:15
"Dio mio" – 3:06
"E lei venne!" – 2:40
"Compagna Teresa" – 3:59
"L'impero delle tenebre" – 4:13
"Scende la notte" – 4:03
"Carrarmatorock!" – 4:11
"Il turbamento della gelosia" – 5:09
"Lezione di musica" – 6:35
"La canzone di Tom" – 5:07
"Maria Maddalena" – 8:06

Line Up
 Pierpaolo Capovilla – voice
 Gionata Mirai – guitar
 Giulio Favero – bass
 Francesco Valente – drums

Guests
 Nicola Manzan – violin on "Maria Maddalena" 
 Angelo Maria Santisi – cello on "Maria Maddalena" 
 Richard Tiso – bass on "Lezione di musica"

References

External links
 

2007 albums
Il Teatro degli Orrori albums